The James "Jay" H. Byrd Jr. Unit (DU) is a Texas Department of Criminal Justice prison for men located in Huntsville, Texas. The prison was named after James H. Byrd, a former prison warden.

The facility is the TDCJ's primary prisoner intake facility in Huntsville. All male death row offenders and male offenders with life imprisonment without parole enter the TDCJ system through Byrd. From there, the inmates with life without parole sentences go on to their assigned facilities. Male death row offenders go on to the Allan B. Polunsky Unit, and female death row offenders go on to the Mountain View Unit.

Notable inmates

References

External links 

 Unit information by the Texas Department of Criminal Justice

Prisons in Huntsville, Texas
Government agencies established in 1964
1964 establishments in Texas